Lancaster High School is a public, co-educational high school located in Lancaster, California, United States. Founded in 1995, it is the sixth oldest comprehensive high school in the Antelope Valley Union High School District.

2022 lockdown incident
On September 14, 2022, Lancaster High School was placed on lockdown due to multiple reports of an active shooter on campus. Los Angeles County Sheriff’s deputies swarmed the campus and conducted a room-by-room and building-by-building search following the call for service. After a thorough search of the campus by law enforcement partners, there was no evidence of a crime and the report was determined to be a prank call. The incident also prompted a lockdown at West Wind Elementary School on 36th Street West. It also prompted Antelope Valley College to cancel a previously scheduled evacuation drill. The campus remained open.

Notable alumni
 Dewayne Dedmon - NBA basketball player
 Adam Wheeler - Olympic wrestler

References

External links
Lancaster High School website

High schools in Los Angeles County, California
Educational institutions established in 1995
Education in Lancaster, California
Public high schools in California
1995 establishments in California